John Edward Green (10 September 1945 – 22 August 2020) was an Australian politician.

Green was born in Hobart and holds a Bachelor of Law. On 17 August 1974 he was elected in a recount to the Tasmanian House of Assembly to fill the vacancy in the seat of Denison caused by the resignation of Labor MP Kevin Corby. He held the seat until 1980, when he was defeated.

References

1945 births
2020 deaths
Politicians from Hobart
Members of the Tasmanian House of Assembly
Australian Labor Party members of the Parliament of Tasmania